Romulus Ciobanu (born 18 June 1977 in Pucioasa, Dâmbovița County) is a Romanian former football player. He played as a midfielder. He is currently a coach.

Club career

Romulus Ciobanu began his youth career at Universitatea Craiova and made his debut at Cimentul Fieni, a team with which in 1998 he also managed to promote in Divizia B.

After Cimentul Fieni he moved to Drobeta-Turnu Severin, a team with whom he also promoted in Divizia B.

He made his debut in the Divizia A at 27 years old for Politehnica Timișoara where he played in the 2004/2005 season.

References

External links
 
 
 

1977 births
Living people
People from Pucioasa
Romanian footballers
Association football midfielders
Liga I players
CSO Plopeni players
FC Politehnica Timișoara players
FC Vaslui players
FC Astra Giurgiu players
Liga II players
ASC Daco-Getica București players
Moldovan Super Liga players
FC Zimbru Chișinău players
Romanian expatriate footballers
Romanian expatriate sportspeople in Moldova
Expatriate footballers in Moldova
Romanian football managers
CSO Plopeni managers
FC Petrolul Ploiești managers